Kovach (Cyrillic: Ковач; also transliterated Kovač) may refer to:

Kovach (surname)
Kovach (Stara Zagora Province), a village in Bulgaria
Kovach (island)
Duvdevani and Kovach, an Israeli comedy

See also
 Kovách, a surname
 Kovač (disambiguation) (Ковач)
 Kováč, a surname
 Kovachevo (disambiguation) (Ковачево; also translit. Kovačevo)
 Kovachitsa (Ковачица; also translit. Kovačica), a village in Bulgaria
 Kovachevitsa (Ковачевица; also translit. Kovačevica), a village in Bulgaria
 Kovachevtsi (disambiguation) (Ковачевци; also translit. Kovačevci)